Each national team submitted a squad of 20 players, two of whom had to be goalkeepers.

Players in boldface have been capped at full international level since the tournament.

Ages are as of the start of the tournament, 18 June 2022.

Group A

Slovakia 

Head coach: Albert Rusnák

Slovakia named their squad on 12 June 2022.

Romania 

Head coach: Adrian Văsâi

Romania named their squad on 15 June 2022.

Note: Denis Lungu-Bocean has been included in the squad as an emergency back-up.

Italy 

Head coach: Carmine Nunziata

Italy named their squad on 16 June 2022.

Note: Giorgio Scalvini and Wilfried Gnonto were originally included in the list, but their submission was eventually denied by their respective clubs.

France 

Head coach: Landry Chauvin

France named their squad on 12 June 2022.

Group B

England 

Head coach: Ian Foster

The following players were named in the squad for the 2022 UEFA European Under-19 Championship, and for the final match against  on 1 July 2022.

Names in bold denote players who have been capped by England in a higher age group.

Israel 

Head coach: Ofir Haim

 The following players were called up for the 2022 UEFA European Under-19 Championship, and for the final match against  on 1 July 2022.
 Match dates: 19 June 2022 – 1 July 2022
 Caps and goals correct as of: 28 June 2022, after the semi-final match against 
 Names in italics denote players who have been capped for the U-21 team.

Serbia 

Head coach: Aleksandar Jović

Serbia named their squad on 15 June 2022.

Note: Mateja Gočmanac has been included in the squad as an emergency back-up.

Austria 

Head coach: Martin Scherb

Austria named their squad on 16 June 2022.

Note: Sandali Conde, Sandro Schendl, Emilian Metu and Dominik Weixlbraun have been included in the squad as emergency back-ups.

Muharem Huskovic left the squad due to an injury and was subsequently replaced by Dominik Weixlbraun.

References 

2022 UEFA European Under-19 Championship
UEFA European Under-19 Championship squads